Barbara-Anne Barrett married name Barbara-Anne Clark (born 1951), is a female former athlete who competed for England.

Athletics career
She represented England in the long jump, at the 1970 British Commonwealth Games in Edinburgh, Scotland.

At the 1971 European Athletics Championships in Helsinki and in 1973 she became the English indoor champion.

References

1951 births
English female long jumpers
Athletes (track and field) at the 1970 British Commonwealth Games
Living people
Commonwealth Games competitors for England